This is a list of films receiving the most Academy Awards at each awards ceremony.  This also contains a list of films receiving the most Academy Award nominations at each awards ceremony.

This information is current as of the 95th Academy Awards ceremony, held on March 12, 2023, which honored the best films of 2022.

List of films receiving the most Academy Awards per ceremony 

 Notes

Historical progression of most Academy Awards per ceremony 

This table displays the historical progression of films receiving a record number of Academy Awards:

List of films receiving the most Academy Award nominations per ceremony 

 Notes

Historical progression of most Academy Award nominations per ceremony 

This table displays the historical progression of films receiving a record number of Academy Award nominations:

Superlatives 

 Films receiving the most Academy Awards per ceremony

 The Lord of the Rings: The Return of the King (2003) earned the largest "clean sweep" of Academy Awards, winning all 11 awards out of its 11 nominations (including Best Picture).

 Films receiving the most Academy Award nominations per ceremony

 With only one exception  Dreamgirls (2006)  every film on this list above was nominated for Best Picture.

 Films receiving the most Academy Awards and the most Academy Award nominations per ceremony

 A total of 69 films appear on both lists above.  That is, there are 69 films that received the most Academy Awards  as well as the most Academy Award nominations  in their respective years of eligibility.
 Of these 69 films, all 69 received a Best Picture nomination.
 Of these 69 films, 52 received the Best Picture award.

 Best Picture winners receiving the most Academy Awards and the most Academy Award nominations per ceremony

 A total of 69 films received both the most Academy Awards and the most Academy Award nominations in their respective years of eligibility.  Of these 69 films, 52 also received the Best Picture award.
 The first film to achieve this feat was: Cimarron  (19301931).
 The most recent film to achieve this feat was: Everything Everywhere All at Once (2022).

 Record-breaking films

 The following four films either set, broke, or tied both records  the film with the most Academy Awards and the film with the most Academy Award nominations  in their respective years of eligibility:
 7th Heaven (19271928), 
 Cimarron (19301931), 
 Gone with the Wind (1939), and 
 Titanic (1997).

See also 

 List of Academy Award records

 
Most
Academy Awards